Hibbertia basaltica, commonly known as basalt guinea flower, is a species of flowering plant in the family Dilleniaceae and is endemic to Tasmania. It is a prostrate or low-lying subshrub with linear to oblong leaves and yellow flowers with five or six stamens arranged in a two groups on either side of the two carpels.

Description
There are four or five stamens in a group on one side of the two carpels and a single erect stamen on the other side. Flowering mainly occurs from late September to late November.

Taxonomy
Hibbertia basaltica was first described in 2006 by Alex M. Buchanan and Richard B. Schahinger in the journal Muelleria collected in an old quarry near Pontville in 2004. The specific epithet (basaltica) refers to the basalt on which this species usually grows.

Distribution and habitat
Basalt guinea flower is only known from basalt areas between Pontville and Bridgewater near the lower reaches of the Jordan River in Tasmania, where it grows in areas of native grassland.

Conservation status
Hibbertia basaltica is listed as "endangered" under the Australia Government Environment Protection and Biodiversity Conservation Act 1999 and the Tasmanian Government Threatened Species Protection Act 1995.

See also
List of Hibbertia species

References

basaltica
Flora of Tasmania
Plants described in 2006